Elektronikpraxis -  Das professionelle Elektronikmagazin (translation Electronic Practice − The professional electronics magazine), also known as Elektronik Praxis, is an industrial electronics magazine. The magazine was launched in 1966 in West Germany as a sister magazine of Elektroteknik.

Elektronik Praxis is published with 24 issues annually (plus special issues) by  Vogel Business Media in Würzburg with a circulation of 46,360 copies (2nd quarter of 2006). It has editorial offices in Munich and Würzburg.

Elektronik Praxis is the publication branch of Fachverbandes Elektronik-Design e.V. (FED). The website of the magazine is intended to complement a so-called "Business Efficiency Portal", with additional information to the printed material.

References

External links
 

1966 establishments in West Germany
Biweekly magazines published in Germany
Engineering magazines
German-language magazines
Magazines established in 1966
Mass media in Würzburg
Professional and trade magazines